William Kellett (19 December 1839 – 19 March 1916) was an Australian politician. He was the member for Stanley in the Legislative Assembly of Queensland from 1878 to 1888.

Kellett died in 1916 and was buried in Toowong Cemetery.

References

1839 births
1916 deaths
Members of the Queensland Legislative Assembly
Place of birth missing
Burials at Toowong Cemetery